

This is a list of the National Register of Historic Places listings in Lancaster County, Pennsylvania.

This is intended to be a complete list of the properties and districts on the National Register of Historic Places in Lancaster County, Pennsylvania, United States.  The locations of National Register properties and districts for which the latitude and longitude coordinates are included below, may be seen in a map.

There are 209 properties and districts listed on the National Register in the county.  The city of Lancaster is the location of 57 of these properties and districts; they are listed separately, while the 153 properties and districts in the other parts of the county are listed here.  One property straddles the Lancaster city limits and appears on both lists.  Another three sites are further designated as National Historic Landmarks.  Yet another property was once listed but has been removed.

Current listings

Lancaster

Exclusive of Lancaster

|}

Former listings

|}

See also 

 List of National Historic Landmarks in Pennsylvania
 National Register of Historic Places listings in Pennsylvania
 List of Pennsylvania state historical markers in Lancaster

References 

Lancaster County